Tin Chung Court is a Home Ownership Scheme court developed by the Hong Kong Housing Authority in Tin Shui Wai, New Territories, Hong Kong, near Tin Wah Estate, Light Rail Chestwood stop and Tin Shui Wai Park. It comprises 15 residential blocks completed in 1999 and 2002 respectively.

History

Short piling scandal
In 1999, the piles of Blocks K (Chung Po House) and L (Chung Ho House) were found to be shortened by up to seven meters compared with the standard requirement. Foundation strengthening works was then carried out in the block and completed in 2002. 640 units in the two blocks were sold to the public in 2009.

Houses

Demographics
According to the 2016 by-census, Tin Chung Court had a population of 18,044. The median age was 41.6 and the majority of residents (95.5 per cent) were of Chinese ethnicity. The average household size was 3.1 people. The median monthly household income of all households (i.e. including both economically active and inactive households) was HK$28,750.

Politics
For the 2019 District Council election, the estate fell within two constituencies. Most of the estate is located in the Chung Wah constituency, which is represented by Chan Sze-nga. The remainder falls within the Chung Pak constituency, which is represented by Lee Wai-fung.

See also

Public housing estates in Tin Shui Wai
List of Home Ownership Scheme Courts in Hong Kong

References

Tin Shui Wai
Home Ownership Scheme
Residential buildings completed in 1999
Residential buildings completed in 2002
Residential buildings completed in 2009
1999 establishments in Hong Kong